The 2002 African Women's Championship was the fifth edition of the African Women's Championship (now known as the Africa Women Cup of Nations), the biennial international football championship organised by the Confederation of African Football (CAF) for the women's national teams of Africa. It was held in Nigeria between 7 December and 20 December 2002.

The tournament determined the CAF's two qualifiers for the 2003 FIFA Women's World Cup — the winner Nigeria and the runner-up Ghana. Nigeria won its fifth title, beating Ghana 2–0 in the final.

Host selection
In January 2001, the Botswana Football Association  had confirmed that the country has submitted a bid to host the tournament. It is unknown if they withdrew from bidding later.

Nigeria were elected as hosts in March 2002 after there were no serious takers for the tournament. Nigerian officials were approached by the CAF at the 2002 African Cup of Nations finals in Mali and were keen to host the tournament. Nigeria had hosted the tournament previously, in 1998.

Qualification

Nigeria qualified automatically as both hosts and defending champions, while the remaining seven spots were determined by the qualifying rounds, which took place from August to October 2002.

Format
Qualification ties were played on a home-and-away two-legged basis. If the aggregate score was tied after the second leg, the away goals rule would be applied, and if still level, the penalty shoot-out would be used to determine the winner (no extra time would be played).

The seven winners of the final round qualified for the final tournament.

Qualified teams

Ethiopia and Mali made their first appearances in the tournament. 

1 Bold indicates champions for that year. Italic indicates hosts for that year.

Officials
The following referees were named for the tournament:

 Ondo Akono
 Chimane Nombauli
 Mukulu Mbula
 Scholastica Tetteh
 Bola Abidoye
 Bolanle Sekiteri
 Xonam Agboyi
 Constance Adipo

Format
The eight teams were divided into two groups of four teams each. The top two teams in the groups advanced to the semi-finals. The finalists of the tournament qualified for the 2003 FIFA Women's World Cup in the United States.

The teams were ranked according to points (3 points for a win, 1 point for a draw, 0 points for a loss).

Results

Group stage

Group A

Group B

Knockout stage
In the knockout stage, if a match is level at the end of normal playing time, extra time is played (two periods of 15 minutes each) and followed, if necessary, by kicks from the penalty mark to determine the winner, except for the third place match where no extra time is played.

Semi-finals
Winners qualified for the 2003 FIFA Women's World Cup.

Third-place playoff

Final

The match was held up for about 5 minutes after fans pelted a linesman with sachets of water after Alberta Sackey had not been given offside (but missed the chance anyway).

Awards

Statistics

Team statistics

Goalscorers
4 goals

 Alberta Sackey
 Perpetua Nkwocha
 Veronica Phewa

3 goals

 Mercy Akide
 Stella Mbachu

2 goals

 Awasso Endegene-Leme
 Mavis Dgajmah
 Nana Gyamfuah
 Rokiatou Samake
 Ifenyichukwu Chiejine
 Esther Zulu Talent

1 goal

 Irene Gonçalves
 Jacinta Rios
 Antoinette Anounga
 Rolande Belemgoto
 Christelle Pokam
 Madeleine Ngono Mani
 Adjoa Bayor
 Maïchata Konaté
 Ekpo Effionwan
 Florence Iweta
 Olaitan Yusuf
 Antonia Carelse
 Lydia Monyepao

Unknown goalscorers
: 3 additional goals

Qualified teams for FIFA Women's World Cup
The following two teams from CAF qualified for the 2003 FIFA Women's World Cup.

1 Bold indicates champions for that year. Italic indicates hosts for that year.

References

External links
 Tables & Results at RSSSF.com

2002 African Women's Championship